Bard Azhadha (also Romanized as Bard Āzhadhā) is a village in Seyyedvaliyeddin Rural District, Sardasht District, Dezful County, Khuzestan Province, Iran. At the 2006 census, its population was 26, in 4 families.

References 

Populated places in Dezful County